Paola Tedesco (born 28 March 1952) is an Italian actress, voice actress and singer.

Biography
Born in Rome, the daughter of voice actor and tenor Sergio Tedesco and the younger sister of film producer Maurizio Tedesco, Paola Tedesco made her film debut at the age of 12, chosen by Pier Paolo Pasolini to play Salome in The Gospel According to St. Matthew (1964).

After a long hiatus and a few minor roles (including Rosaline in the 1968 film Romeo and Juliet), she resurfaced in 1971, playing the title role in the Mario Amendola's musicarello Lady Barbara. In subsequent years, Tedesco successfully starred in several comedy and genre films. She was also active on televisions, in TV-movies, series and variety shows.

Filmography

Cinema
The Gospel According to St. Matthew (1964) - Salomè
Romeo and Juliet (1968) - Rosaline (uncredited)
Satyricon (1969) - Criside - Circe's handmaid
Hurrah For the Women! (1970) - Nené - the cashier
L'homme orchestre (1970) - La fille sicilienne
Lady Barbara (1970) - Lady Barbara Parker
I due maghi del pallone (1970) - Mayor's Daughter
Belle d'amore (1970) - Monique
Man of the Year (1971) - Friend of Cocò
The Two Aces of Boxing (1971) - Marisa
The Nights of Boccaccio (1972) - Lidia
Crime Boss (1972) - Monica
One Russian Summer (1973) - Yulya
Battle of the Amazons (1973) - Valeria
Silent Action (1975) - Giuliana Raimondi aka la Tunisina
Il sogno di Zorro (1975) - Zaira
Amore grande, amore libero (1976) - Simona
Le seminariste (1976) - Gertrude
Nerone (1977) - Licia
Watch Me When I Kill (1977) - Mara
Un'ombra nell'ombra (1979) - Anna Merrill
I Hate Blondes (1980) - Teresa
Lucky and Zorba (1998) - Rosa Dei Venti (voice)

Television
Il segno del comando (1971)
Door into Darkness (1973)
La granduchessa e i camerieri (1977)

Dubbing roles

Animation
Zira in The Lion King II: Simba's Pride
Muriel P. Finster in Recess
Grand Councilwoman in Lilo & Stitch
Grand Councilwoman in Stitch! The Movie
Grand Councilwoman in Leroy & Stitch
Dr. Blight in Captain Planet and the Planeteers
Baba Yaga in Bartok the Magnificent
Elgar in The New Adventures of Ocean Girl

Live action
Ms. Kornblut in Marley & Me
Diane Freed in Happiness
Nanny in So Notorious

References

External links 

 
  Paola Tedesco at Discogs

1952 births
Living people
Italian film actresses
Italian television actresses
Italian stage actresses
Italian voice actresses
Musicians from Rome
Italian women singers
Italian television personalities